The  is a national university in the city of Chōfu, Tokyo, Japan.

It specialises in the disciplines of computer science, the physical sciences, engineering and technology. It was founded in 1918 as the Technical Institute for Wireless-Communications.

History
The University of Electro-communications was founded in the Azabu district, Tokyo city as the Technical Institute for Wireless-Communications by Wireless Association in 1918. The Technical Institute for Wireless-Communications was transferred to the Ministry of Communications in 1942 and renamed to the Central Technical Institute for Wireless-Communications in 1945. Following to the transfer from the Ministry of Communications to the Ministry of Education in 1948, the University of Electro-communications was established as a national university in 1949. The campus was moved to the city of Chōfu, Tokyo in 1957. The university has been run by the National University Corporation since 2004.

School symbol
The school symbol was set in 1949. The design shows a Lissajous figure of the frequency ratio ob 5 to 6 with Kanji character "学" which means "University". The frequency ratio of 5 to 6 means the commercial power frequency of 50 Hz (eastern Japan) and 60 Hz (western Japan), and indicates Japan-wide harmonization. The meaning of school symbol is common with that of school name which is "to establish an university which is open to all over Japan, by call it by a name without any geographical name".

Rankings

Global
The Times Higher Education World University Rankings 2018 ranks UEC in the bracket of the 801-1000 best universities in the world.

Organisation

Faculties
Faculty of Electro-Communications (until 2010)
Information and Communication Engineering
Computer Science
Electronic Engineering
Applied Physics and Chemistry
Mechanical Engineering and Intelligent Systems
Systems Engineering
Human Communications
Faculty of Informatics and Engineering (since 2010)
Informatics
Communication Engineering and Informatics
Mechanical Engineering and Intelligent Systems
Engineering Science
Fundamental Programs for Advanced Engineering

Graduate schools
Graduate School of Electro-Communications (Until 2010)
Information and Communication Engineering
Computer Science
Electronic Engineering
Applied Physics and Chemistry
Mechanical Engineering and Intelligent Systems
Systems Engineering
Human Communication
Graduate School of Informatics and Engineering (Since 2010)
Informatics
Communication Engineering and Informatics
Mechanical Engineering and Intelligent Systems
Engineering Science
Graduate School of Information Systems
Human Media Systems
Social Intelligence and Informatics
Information Network Systems
Information on System Fundamentals

Centers for Education and Research
Institute for Laser Science
Advanced Wireless Communication Research Center(AWCC)
Center for Space Science and Radio Engineering (SSRE)
Center for Frontier Science and Engineering
Center for Photonic Innovation
Research Center for Ubiquitous Networking and Computing
Advanced Ultrafast Laser Research Center
Innovation Research Center for Fuel Cells

Notable faculty
Kwan-ichi Terazawa - mathematician and member of the Japan Academy
Noriaki Kano - consultant in quality management, recipient of the Deming Prize (1997), and also known for Kano model
Masahiro Mori - roboticist
Kanji Nishio - German literary figure and philosopher
Te Sun Han -  information theorist and recipient of the Shannon Award (2010)
Hisaki Matsuura - poet and novelist

Notable alumni

Businesspersons
Ken Kutaragi, B.E. in Electronic Engineering in 1975 - former CEO of Sony Computer Entertainment, current Honorary Chairman of Sony Corporation, and also known as Father of PlayStation
Kōichi Nakamura - video game designer and founder of Chunsoft

Scholars and Researchers
Sumio Iijima, B.E. in 1963 - discoverer of carbon nanotubes and recipient of the Benjamin Franklin Medal (2002) and the Balzan Prize (2007)
Seinosuke Toda, B.E. in 1982, M.E. in 1984 - computer scientist, recipient of the Gödel Prize (1998), and also known for Toda's theorem

Others
Kiana Danial - personal investing and wealth management expert, CEO of Invest Diva
Noritoshi Ishida - politician and member of New Komeito Party
Jirō Nitta - novelist
Soichi Terada - composer and musician

References

External links
The University of Electro-Communications
The University of Electro-Communications (in English)
UEC Library
UEC Campus map

 
Japanese national universities
Educational institutions established in 1918
Universities and colleges in Tokyo
Engineering universities and colleges in Japan
Chōfu, Tokyo
1918 establishments in Japan